Áine Ní Dhioraí, Irish author and broadcaster.

Ní Dhioraí was once Head of News at RTÉ Raidió na Gaeltachta. She is a native of County Donegal. Her book, Na Cruacha: Scéalta agus Seanchas, a compilation of folklore collected in the 1900s, was published by Cló Iar-Chonnacht.

External links
 https://www.cic.ie/en/books/published-books/na-cruacha-scealta-agus-seanchas-leabhair-cloite
 

21st-century Irish people
Living people
Irish-language writers
Irish women radio presenters
People from County Donegal
Irish broadcasters
Year of birth missing (living people)
RTÉ Raidió na Gaeltachta presenters